Kay Gunnar Leopold Pollak (born 21 May 1938) is a Swedish film director.

Career
After a long break from film-making, he returned in 2004 with As It Is in Heaven (Så som i himmelen), a major box office success in Sweden. The film was nominated for an Academy Award for Best Foreign Language Film. It was also nominated for no less than eight Swedish Guldbagge Awards, including Best Direction and Best Film, but received none.

TV and filmography
The secret reality/Den Hemliga Verkligheten (1973) - script by Kay and Annamaria Pollak. Actors include Bertil Norström, Claes Elefalk, Stig Ossian Ericson and Peter Lindgren.
Elvis! Elvis! (1977) - based on the book by Maria Gripe. Actors include Lele Dorazio and Allan Edwall. Entered into the 10th Moscow International Film Festival.
Children's Island (Barnens ö) (1980) - based on the book by P. C. Jersild. Actors include Börje Ahlstedt and Tomas Fryk. It won the awards for Best Film, Best Director and Best Actor (Hirdwall) at the 17th Guldbagge Awards. It was also entered into the 31st Berlin International Film Festival.
Love Me! (Älska mig) (1986) - about a teenaged girl called Sussie (Anna Lindén) who is placed in a foster home. It was entered into the 36th Berlin International Film Festival.
As It Is in Heaven (Så som i himmelen) (2004) - actors include Michael Nyqvist and Frida Hallgren.

References

External links

Swedish Institute information sheet: Swedish cinema gaining ground - On the success of As It Is in Heaven and other contemporary Swedish films.

1938 births
Living people
People from Gothenburg
Swedish film directors
Swedish screenwriters
Swedish male screenwriters
Umeå University alumni
Sommar (radio program) hosts
Best Director Guldbagge Award winners
20th-century Swedish people